Catacantha is a genus of moths in the family Saturniidae first described by Eugène Louis Bouvier in 1930.

Species
Catacantha evitae Brechlin & Meister & van Schayck, 2010
Catacantha ferruginea (Draudt, 1929)
Catacantha juliae Brechlin & Meister & van Schayck, 2010
Catacantha latifasciata Bouvier, 1930
Catacantha nataliae Brechlin & Meister & van Schayck, 2010
Catacantha obliqua Bouvier, 1930
Catacantha oculata (Schaus, 1921)
Catacantha siriae Brechlin & Meister & van Schayck, 2010
Catacantha sofiae Brechlin & Meister & van Schayck, 2010
Catacantha stramentalis (Draudt, 1929)
Catacantha tabeae Brechlin & Meister & van Schayck, 2010

References

Hemileucinae
Taxa named by Eugène Louis Bouvier